Almir may refer to:

 Almir (given name)
 Almir (footballer, born 1938), Almir da Silva, Brazilian football striker
 Almir (footballer, born 1969), Almir de Souza Fraga, Brazilian football striker
 Almir (footballer, born 1973), Almir Moraes Andrade, Brazilian football manager and former midfielder
 Almir (footballer, born 1982), Almir Lopes de Luna, Brazilian football attacking midfielder